refers to several Japanese railway lines:
Seibu Shinjuku Line, owned by Seibu Railway
Toei Shinjuku Line, owned by Tokyo Metropolitan Bureau of Transportation

See also 
Shōnan-Shinjuku Line, operated by JR East